Jim Krusoe is an American novelist, poet, and short story writer. His stories and poems have appeared in Antioch Review, Denver Quarterly, BOMB, Iowa Review, Field, North American Review, American Poetry Review, and Santa Monica Review, which he founded in 1988. His essays and book reviews have appeared in Manoa, the Los Angeles Times Book Review, The New York Times and the Washington Post. He is a recipient of fellowships from the National Endowment of the Arts and the Lila Wallace Reader's Digest Fund. He teaches at Santa Monica College and in the graduate writing program at Antioch University, Los Angeles. His novel Iceland was selected by the Los Angeles Times and the Austin Chronicle as one of the ten best fiction books of 2002, and it was on the Washington Post list of notable fiction for the same year.

Bibliography

References

External links
  Girl Factory at Tin House Books
 Excerpt from Girl Factory
  Reviews of Girl Factory
 Q & A with Jim Krusoe

20th-century American novelists
21st-century American novelists
American male novelists
Year of birth missing (living people)
Living people
American male short story writers
20th-century American poets
21st-century American poets
American male poets
20th-century American short story writers
21st-century American short story writers
20th-century American male writers
21st-century American male writers